Hugh Futcher (born 29 October 1937 in Portsmouth, Hampshire) is an English actor in theatre, television and film. He was a member of the stock company of the Carry On films, with notable parts in Carry On Spying, Carry On at Your Convenience, and Carry On Behind. Other films include Roman Polanski's Repulsion (as Colin's pubmate Reggie) and the Herman's Hermits musical Mrs. Brown, You've Got a Lovely Daughter.

In television, Futcher had a recurring role in the adventure series Orlando as "Hedgehog." He has also appeared on The Saint, Z-Cars, The Sweeney, Minder, and Casualty. In 1972 he appeared in the Doctor Who serial "The Sea Devils", and 'Six Days of Justice', in the episode 'A Private Nuisance', with Earl Cameron (actor) and Mollie Sugden. Fifteen years later he was considered for the role of the Seventh Doctor, but accepted other work that precluded taking the part.

He appeared with Brian Murphy and Maureen Lipman in the 1985 television drama On Your Way, Riley.

In 2011 he appeared in episode 5 of series 5 of MI High as George.

Filmography

References

External links

1937 births
Living people
English male film actors
Male actors from Portsmouth